Amy Nicoletto is an American tattoo artist and television personality. She is most known for her appearances  on the TLC reality television show LA Ink. Her name is sometimes misspelled as Nicoletti or Nicoletta.

Biography
Amy Nicoletto was born in southern New Jersey. She received her first tattoo at the age of 18 and has embraced the art of tattooing ever since. Her career has spanned many fields including specialist and management roles in hospitality, medical assisting and also as a makeup artist for a cosmetics chain. She completed a two-year apprenticeship and then began professionally tattooing in 2005 locally in New Jersey.

In 2008, she relocated to Los Angeles, California and landed a spot at Craig Jackman's American Electric Tattoo on Sunset Silver Lake, Los Angeles. A casting representative for TLC's LA Ink approached her at that shop and asked if she would like to try out for a new reality show. She was hired and appeared in many episodes during Seasons 3 and 4 playing the role of herself on LA Ink. On the show, she took up a short-lived position at High Voltage Tattoo, then moved back to American Electric Tattoo and continued on as an LA Ink show regular well into the end of the last season. On one episode, Nicoletto tattooed black-and-gray stitches around the neck of Dr. Chud from the rock band The Misfits.

Nicoletto is currently touring with several tattoo shows including the Villain Arts Tattoo Shows, Ink Life Tour, and others.

Between conventions and shows, she is often on the road guest spotting in various locations around the USA. Nicoletto's favorite tattoo styles include black-and-gray portraits, Japanese-influenced tattoos and just about anything with color, as well as lettering. In her spare time, Nicoletto enjoys her home base in Los Angeles.

References

External links

 Official website (archive)
 

American tattoo artists
Participants in American reality television series
People from New Jersey
Living people
Year of birth missing (living people)